York and Cumberland Railroad may refer to:
York and Cumberland Railroad (Maine), 1846-1865, predecessor of the Rochester to Portland branch line of the Boston and Maine Railroad, reorganized as the Portland and Rochester Railroad in 1867 completed to Rochester in 1871, with a connection to Canada via the Grand Trunk Railway in Portland. It was merged with the Worcester & Nashua into the Worcester, Nashua and Rochester Railroad in 1883. The Boston and Maine Railroad leased the line in 1886 and later acquired it wholly; the line is still owned by its successor.
York and Cumberland Railroad (Pennsylvania), 1846-1854, predecessor of the Northern Central Railway (Pennsylvania Railroad system)